Newton Game Dynamics is an open-source physics engine for realistically simulating rigid bodies in games and other real-time applications.  Its solver is deterministic and not based on traditional LCP or iterative methods.

Newton Game Dynamics is actively developed by Julio Jerez. Currently a new version which will take advantage of multi-core CPUs and GPUs is being developed.

Games that used Newton 
This is a select list of games using Newton Game Dynamics.
 Amnesia: Rebirth
 Amnesia: A Machine for Pigs
 Amnesia: The Dark Descent
 b4n92uid theBall
 City Bus Simulator
 Future Pinball – a 3D pinball editing and gaming application
 Mount & Blade
 Nicktoons Winners Cup Racing
 Overclocked: A History of Violence
 Penumbra: Overture
 Penumbra: Black Plague
 Penumbra: Requiem
 SOMA
 Steam Brigade

Engines which incorporated Newton 
A list of game engines using Newton Game Dynamics:

 HPL Engine 1, 2, and 3

See also 
 Physics Abstraction Layer (PAL)
 Open Dynamics Engine (ODE)
 Project Chrono

External links 
 Github repository with latest development changes
 Official Newton Game Dynamics homepage

References 

Computer physics engines
Software using the zlib license